This is a list of mayors of Manchester, New Hampshire.

Political party designations are shown for some mayors, where known. However, municipal elections are officially non-partisan.

Throughout most of the previous century, elections have been held in odd-numbered years. Mayors are elected for a two-year term of office. The first city election in Manchester, New Hampshire occurred on August 19, 1846.

The administrative and executive powers of the city are vested in the mayor. The mayor must be a resident of the city for at least a year prior to filing for the office of mayor. The mayor has the power to supervise the administrative affairs of the city and presides over meetings of the Board of Mayor and Aldermen. The mayor is the de facto head of the Board of School Committee, which oversees the city’s schools.

From 1846 to 1857, mayors served for a one-year term, expiring on the third Tuesday in March. From 1857 to 1872, the mayor's term expired on the last day of December. In 1873, the term ended annually on the Third Tuesday in March, up until 1880, when it became a two-year term.

List

See also
Mayoral elections in Manchester, New Hampshire

References
 Manchester City Clerk's office, list of mayors
 Board of Mayor and Aldermen election results, 1846–2003 (.pdf file)
 Manchester City Government Book, 2004–2005. For dates of mayors' terms.

References

 
Manchester, New Hampshire